Sir Horace James Seymour  (26 February 1885 – 10 September 1978) was a British diplomat who served in Washington, D.C., Tehran, the Hague, Rome, and Chungking. He was Principal Private Secretary to the British Foreign Secretary and Assistant Under-Secretary of State at the Foreign Office. His most senior appointment was as British Ambassador to China from 1942 to 1946.

Early life and family
The elder son of Hugh Francis Seymour and Rachel Blanche Lascelles, and the great-grandson of Col. Hugh Henry John Seymour, a grandson of Francis Seymour-Conway, 1st Marquess of Hertford, and a descendant of Edward Seymour, 1st Duke of Somerset, Seymour was educated at Eton and Trinity College, Cambridge.

Career

Seymour entered the Foreign Office and Diplomatic Service in 1908. He was Second Secretary at the British Embassy to the United States in 1919, First Secretary in the Netherlands in 1923 and in Italy in 1925, then from 1932 to 1936 Principal Private Secretary to the Foreign Secretary. He was next British Minister ('Envoy Extraordinary and Minister Plenipotentiary') in Tehran, from 1936 to 1939, Assistant Under-Secretary of State at the Foreign Office, 1939 to 1942, and then Ambassador to China, from 1942 to 1946. He retired in 1947.

On 8 May 1944, Seymour presented the insignia of a Knight Commander of the Bath to He Yingqin, Chinese Minister of War and Chief of the General Staff, in Chungking.
 
Between April 1947 and July 1947, Seymour was a member of the Franco-Siamese Boundary Commission sitting in Washington, D.C., and in December 1947 he was appointed as chairman of the British Delegation to the Balkans Commission, based at Salonika, Greece.

Marriage and children

In 1917, Horace James Seymour married Violet, a daughter of Thomas Edward Erskine, and they had three daughters, Jane (who died in infancy), Joan, and Virginia, and one son, Hugh Francis Seymour (1926—2010). They lived at Bratton House, near Westbury in Wiltshire.

Honours
Companion of the Order of St Michael and St George, 1927
Commander of the Royal Victorian Order, 1936
Knight Commander of the Order of St Michael and St George, 1939
Knight Grand Cross of the Order of St Michael and St George, 1946

References

External links
Sir Horace James Seymour, portrait at National Portrait Gallery, London
Photos of Sir Horace Seymour, in Joseph Needham Photographs - Wartime China, 1942-1946 in the Needham Research Institute
The Papers of Sir Horace Seymour held at Churchill Archives Centre

1885 births
1978 deaths
Alumni of Trinity College, Cambridge
Ambassadors of the United Kingdom to China
Horace James Seymour
Knights Grand Cross of the Order of St Michael and St George
People educated at Eton College
Principal Private Secretaries to the Secretary of State for Foreign and Commonwealth Affairs
Members of HM Diplomatic Service
Commanders of the Royal Victorian Order
20th-century British diplomats